Phalonidia jequieta is a species of moth of the family Tortricidae. It is found in Bahia, Brazil.

The wingspan is about 6 mm. The ground colour of the forewings is glossy white, dotted with rust. The markings are pale rust ochreous. The hindwings are creamy grey.

References

Moths described in 2002
Phalonidia